The West Channel Pile Light is an active two-storey octagonal lighthouse in Port Phillip, Victoria, Australia. It was built in 1881, replacing a lightship installed in 1854, to mark the north-east end of the West Sand. The site is listed in the Victorian Heritage Register.

See also

 Chinaman's Hat (Port Phillip)
 South Channel Pile Light
 List of lighthouses in Australia

References

Lighthouses completed in 1881
Port Phillip
Lighthouses in Victoria (Australia)
Victorian Heritage Register Greater Melbourne (region)
1881 establishments in Australia
Unincorporated areas of Victoria (Australia)